Opinion polling, locally known as surveys, in the 2016 Philippine presidential and vice presidential elections is conducted by Social Weather Stations (SWS), Pulse Asia, and other pollsters. The last electoral votes were cast on Monday, May 9, 2016.

As the positions of president and vice president are elected separately, pollsters usually have separate surveys for each position.

The figure representing the polling numbers for the candidate that topped each poll is emboldened unless two or more candidates tied, when they are all emboldened. Those figures which are within the margin of error are italicized.

Calendar 

 Filing of candidacies: October 12 to 16, 2015
 Campaign period for candidates for president, vice president, senators and party-list representatives: February 9 to May 7, 2016
 Campaign period for local positions and district representatives: March 26 to May 7, 2016
 Casting of ballots for local absentee voters: April 27 to 29, 2016
 Election day: May 9, 2016

Polling for president

Graphical summary

From the start of the campaign period to Election Day

From the end of candidacy filing to the start of the campaign period

Until candidacy filing ended on 16 October 2015

Single-choice surveys

Three-choice surveys 
These surveys asked participants to rank up to three candidates.

Polling for vice president

Graphical summary

From the start of the campaign period to Election Day

From the end of candidacy filing to the start of the campaign period

Until candidacy filing ended on 16 October 2015

References

2016 Philippine presidential election
2016
Philippines